Priyanshi Somani (born 16 November 1998) is the 2010 Mental Calculation World Cup winner.

Further reading

Mental Calculation World Cup 2010 results
Ordinary Indian women doing extraordinary things
Mental Calculation World Cup, The Daily Beast
Indian reference
Quiz-o-mania, The Hindu

References

External links
Mental Calculation World Cup Website
Memoriad - World Mental Olympics Website

Mental calculators
Women mathematicians
1998 births
Living people
People from Surat